Poydras is a census-designated place (CDP) in St. Bernard Parish, Louisiana, United States. The population was 3,886 at the 2000 census and 2,536 in 2020. It is part of the New Orleans–Metairie–Kenner Metropolitan Statistical Area. Poydras is on the East Bank of the Mississippi River, just upriver from the Plaquemines Parish line.

History

Poydras was first settled in the 18th century by Isleños when Louisiana was a Spanish colony. Presumably, the town is named for Julien Poydras.

Albert Estopinal, Jr., a St. Bernard Parish district attorney, judge, and sheriff, was born in Poydras in 1869 to later U.S. Representative, Albert Estopinal, Sr.

The locally constructed levee failed during the 1922 flood and the community of Poydras was destroyed. Some historians claim that the levee break was intentional to save the City of New Orleans. The New Orleans river stage dropped .2 foot within 24 hours of the Poydras crevasse and a sound levee had been inspected and reported only 30 minutes before the breach occurred.

Poydras was severely damaged by the impact of Hurricane Katrina on 29 August 2005.

Geography
Poydras is located at  (29.869696, -89.888955).

Demographics

As of the census of 2000, there were 3,886 people, 1,361 households, and 1,023 families residing in the CDP. According to the 2020 United States census, there were 2,536 people, 944 households, and 638 families residing in the CDP. The racial makeup of the CDP was 87.88% White, 8.65% African American, 0.77% Native American, 0.57% Asian, 0.05% Pacific Islander, 0.54% from other races, and 1.54% from two or more races in 2000. Hispanic or Latinos of any race were 5.22% of the population. By 2020 its racial makeup was 62.46% non-Hispanic white, 14.71% Black or African American, 0.79% Native American, 0.43% Asian, 4.3% multiracial or another race, and 17.31% Hispanic or Latino of any race, reflecting the demographic shift of American self-identification.

Education
Residents are zoned to schools in the St. Bernard Parish Public Schools.

As of 2015 Chalmette High School serves the population.

References

Census-designated places in Louisiana
Census-designated places in St. Bernard Parish, Louisiana
Census-designated places in New Orleans metropolitan area
Louisiana Isleño communities
Louisiana populated places on the Mississippi River